(also known as , , or Konpira Shrine in English) is a Shinto shrine in the town of Kotohira in Kagawa, Japan. This shrine is patron of sea ship transport and sailors.

Located at  halfway to the top of Mount Zōzu, the shrine stands at the end of a long path, with 785 steps to the main shrine and a total of 1368 steps to the inner shrine. Since the Muromachi period, pilgrimages to the shrine became popular, and even today usually hundreds of visitors in a day climb the steps of Mount Zōzu. On the way to the shrine is a sake museum, stores, and stones with the names of donors carved in kanji.

Before the Meiji era, Kotohira Shrine was also a Buddhist site as well (see honji suijaku).

History
It is said to have been founded during the 1st century.

The principal kami of the shrine is Ō-mono-nushi-no-mikoto, a spirit associated with seafaring (also referred to as the Buddhist deity Konpira). In 1165 the spirit of Emperor Sutoku was also enshrined.

The ema hall is the site of prayers for safe seafaring.

On June 5, 2020, Kintohira Shrine sent a notice to the Association of Shinto Shrines stating that it would abolish its inclusive relationship, due to the fact that the heihaku to be delivered on the day of the Daijō-sai accompanying the enthronement of the Emperor in the first year of Reiwa (2019) was not sent. In November 2020, the withdrawal from the Association was approved and became a standalone shrine.

Treasures
Kompira Shrine has several Important Cultural Properties, including a Heian period statue of the eleven-faced Kannon Bosatsu and four ink paintings by Maruyama Ōkyo.

Gallery

See also

List of Shinto shrines in Japan
Tourism in Japan

Notes

External links

 Kotohira-gū official website 
 Guide to Kotohira-gū on Japan-guide.com 
 

Shinto shrines in Kagawa Prefecture
Emperor Sutoku
Shinbutsu bunri